Dylan Seys (born 26 September 1996) is a Belgian professional footballer who plays as a winger for Greek Super League 2 club Kifisia.

Career

Royal Excel Mouscron
On 27 January 2020 Seys joined Belgian Belgian First Division A club, Royal Excel Mouscron, on a deal until June 2021 with an option for one further year.

Helmond Sport
On 26 July 2021, he signed a one-year contract with Helmond Sport.

Kifisia
On 14 July 2022, Seys signed with Kifisia in Greece.

References

External links
 
 

1996 births
People from Kortrijk
Living people
Belgian footballers
Belgian expatriate footballers
Club Brugge KV players
Hapoel Acre F.C. players
FC Twente players
RKC Waalwijk players
Royal Excel Mouscron players
Excelsior Rotterdam players
Helmond Sport players
A.E. Kifisia F.C. players
Israeli Premier League players
Eredivisie players
Eerste Divisie players
Belgian Pro League players
Association football midfielders
Belgian expatriate sportspeople in Israel
Belgian expatriate sportspeople in the Netherlands
Belgian expatriate sportspeople in Greece
Expatriate footballers in Israel
Expatriate footballers in the Netherlands
Expatriate footballers in Greece
Jong FC Twente players